Robert Williams (born 1955 in Boston) is a drummer and solo artist who has worked with Captain Beefheart, Hugh Cornwell, John Lydon, the Spo-it's, Tex and the Horseheads, Elvira, Mistress of the Dark, and Zoogz Rift, and also performed on recordings for the Pee-wee Herman Show original cast recording.

His albums include:
Captain Beefheart and the Magic Band:
Shiny Beast (Bat Chain Puller)
Doc At The Radar Station
Hugh Cornwell and Robert Williams:
Nosferatu
Robert Williams:
Buy My Record
Late One Night
Date With The Devil's Daughter - The first song, "Hello Robert", consists of messages that Larry "Wild Man" Fischer left on Robert Williams phone
Temporary Immortal (as Beefheart Jr.)
The Spo-it's
Free Sex (AVT00)
Zoogz Rift
Five Billion Pinheads Can't Be Wrong (AVT001)

Television
In 1997, Robert Williams filed a lawsuit against former Sex Pistols lead singer John Lydon (aka Johnny Rotten) for assault and lost wages that was broadcast as an installment on Judge Judy; Williams lost the case due to a lack of evidence.

References

External links
 Discography at United Mutations

1955 births
20th-century American drummers
American male drummers
Living people
Musicians from Boston
The Magic Band members